The following is a list of The Daily Show writers. The show, created by Madeleine Smithberg and Lizz Winstead is an American political satire and news satire. The show, which has aired since 1996, has employed a large and changing staff of writers.

The Daily Show with Craig Kilborn (1996–1998)

The Daily Show with Jon Stewart (1999–2015)

The Daily Show with Trevor Noah (2015–2022)

Footnotes

External links 
 

Writers
Daily Show writers
Daily Show writers